B-Sidor 95–00 is a B-side collection by Swedish alternative rock band Kent. It was released in 2000 and features two new songs, "Chans" and "Spökstad".

"Rödljus II" and "En helt ny karriär II" are new recordings of the original ones. Hidden track "Papin jahti" is an improvisation where the band's drummer Markus sings in Finnish.

Track listing

Personnel
Joakim Berg – lyrics, music
Kristina Jansson – vocals on "Spökstad"
Peter Svensson – guitar on "Om gyllene år"
Chris Gordon – acoustic guitar on 	"På nära håll"

Charts

References

Kent (band) albums
B-side compilation albums
2000 compilation albums
Bertelsmann Music Group compilation albums